The Ferrari 812 Superfast (Type F152M) is a front mid-engine, rear-wheel-drive grand tourer produced by Italian sports car manufacturer Ferrari that made its debut at the 2017 Geneva Motor Show. The 812 Superfast is the successor to the F12berlinetta.

Specifications

Engine 

The 812 Superfast has a  F140 GA V12, an enlarged version of the 6.3-litre engine used in the F12berlinetta. According to Ferrari in 2018, the 812 Superfast's engine was, at the time, the most powerful naturally aspirated production car engine ever made. It does not feature turbocharging or hybrid technology. Cars built in 2019 or before were not fitted with petrol particulate filters, whereas cars built in 2020 or after are now fitted with the emissions device.

Transmission 
The transmission for the 812 Superfast is a 7-speed dual-clutch automatic gearbox manufactured for Ferrari by Getrag, based on the gearbox used in the 458.

Wheels 
The 812 Superfast has 20-inch wheels at the front and the rear. The tires are Pirelli P Zero with codes of 275/35 ZR 20 for the front tires and 315/35 ZR 20 for the rear. The brakes are carbon-ceramic Brembo Extreme Design disc brakes, which Ferrari claims have 5.8% improved braking performance from 100 km/h to 0 km/h as compared to the F12berlinetta.

Aerodynamics 
The car includes a mix of active and passive aerodynamics to improve drag coefficient values over the F12berlinetta. The front of the car is designed to increase downforce and includes intakes for front brake cooling, as well as ducts to increase underbody air flow. The bonnet of the car also has air bypasses to move air through to the side of the car for additional downforce and aero efficiency. The rear diffuser of the 812 Superfast has active flaps that can open up at high speeds to reduce drag.

Performance 
The 812 Superfast is the first Ferrari equipped with EPS (Electronic Power Steering). It also shares the rear-wheel-steering system (Virtual Short Wheelbase 2.0) borrowed from the limited edition F12 TDF. The weight distribution of the car is 47% front, 53% rear. The car has recorded a laptime of 1:21.50 around the Fiorano racetrack, 0.50 seconds behind the more track-focused F12tdf.

Design 
The design is based on the F12berlinetta, with some new styling cues like full LED headlamps, air vents on the bonnet, quad circular tail lights, and a body-colored rear diffuser. The two-box, high tail design of the car is intended to resemble that of the 365 GTB/4 Daytona, a Pininfarina design, though the car was designed at the Ferrari Styling Center.

The interior of the 812 Superfast takes inspiration from both the preceding F12berlinetta and the interior of the LaFerrari, especially the shape and position of the air vents and the contours of the dashboard.

As part of the Ferrari's flagship model design, the 812 Superfast's center control stack continues to lack a central infotainment display featured in entry-level models such as the GTC4Lusso and Portofino, retaining only a small temperature display for the climate control system and splitting all vehicular status information displays among the driver's multifunction instrument cluster, as well as the passenger-side touchscreen stack display above the glove compartment area.

As with certain previous models, the 812 Superfast can be ordered with specially-designed, model name-tagged, multi-piece luggage set which fit into the vehicle's rear trunk.

812 GTS 

Unveiled in September 2019, the Ferrari 812 GTS is the open top version of the 812 Superfast. This marks the first front-engine V12 series production convertible model offered by Ferrari in 50 years, as the convertible variants of the 550, the 575 and the 599 were limited edition models meant for special customers only.

The large rear buttresses present at the rear hold the folding hard top roof under a tonneau cover present between them when not in use.

The GTS weighs  more than the Superfast due to chassis reinforcing components but maintains equal performance. The mechanical components including the engine remain the same as the Superfast except for the transmission which has shorter gear ratios to improve the car's response to throttle inputs. The engine's high-pressure injection system reduces the number of particles that are emitted before the catalytic converter warms up. There is also a new gasoline particulate filter and a stop-start system to improve fuel economy. Other features shared with the Superfast include the Manettino dial, side-slip angle control and variable steering weight. The car has been aerodynamically refined in order to eliminate any turbulence arising from the loss of a fixed roof.

812 Competizione & Competizione A 

On May 5, 2021, Ferrari presented a limited production, track focused version, called Competizione, of the 812 Superfast, this version being presented together with its drop-top variant, Competizione A (for Aperta, Ferrari's moniker for limited open top models, translating to "open" in Italian). Both versions have a more powerful version of 6.5-litre V12, extensive aerodynamic upgrades and the introduction of an independent four-wheel steering system.
The 812 Competizione & Competizione A are the latest iterations of Ferrari's light weight limited edition front mid-engined V12 Berlinetta platform. They are the direct successors to the F12 TDF and 599 GTO. In total, only 999 Competizione and 599 Competizione A will be produced, and both are sold out. As with other strictly limited models from Ferrari, these cars are allocated only to customers that meet certain criteria.

Omologata 
The Ferrari Omologata was unveiled on 25 September 2020. It is a unique model produced for a wealthy European client of the manufacturer. The Omologata is the tenth “V12 engine in front position” project of the special “one-off” department since the 2009 Ferrari P 540 Superfast Aperta.

Ferrari Monza SP 

At a private event held for customers and investors at the company's headquarters in Maranello, Italy in September 2018, Ferrari unveiled the first two models in its new Icona series of models. The cars called the Monza SP1 and SP2 (1 and 2 denoting the seating capacity) are inspired from open top race cars of the 1950s, such as the 750 Monza. The car uses a carbon fibre construction and features bespoke wheels, interior colour choices, small scissor doors and a full LED strip serving as the tail light of the car. The virtual windshield (present ahead of the driver only and a concept used previously in the Mercedes SLR McLaren Stirling Moss) disrupts airflow over the driver in order to maintain maximum driving comfort. Due to the use of lightweight materials, the Monza SP2 weighs  while the SP1 weighs a further  less due to the deletion of passenger seat.

Production of the Monza SP will be limited to 500 units.

Tuner-made versions

Mansory Stallone 812

The Mansory Stallone 812 is a car modified by the German car modification firm Mansory based on the original 812 Superfast.

The car has a new spoiler and lower bodywork painted in black (marble-like) and the engine has been tuned making it have better capabilities than the standard version.

The Interior has been handcrafted and leather based. Accessories made of carbon fibre are present inside.

This car has another version called the Stallone GTS which is based on the Spyder (GTS) model of the Superfast. The car's Interior is leather based (blue colour based Interior).

Novitec N-Largo

Novitec N-Largo is a car modified by the German car tuning company, Novitec group based on the Ferrari 812 Superfast.

The conversion consists of new front and rear quarter panels & bumpers, as well as a host of carbon accessories including side skirts, a fixed rear wing, bonnet inserts, mirror inserts and a front lip. Further options included lowering springs and Vossen x Novitec designed NF10 wheels (21" front / 22" rear).

Most cars were fitted with Novitec's exhaust system which consists of cat replacement pipes/sport cats, centre silencer delete X-pipe and rear silencers (either with or without valves, and made of steel or Inconel).

Thanks to the new, high flow exhaust the V12 engine can now produce .

This car, with its full exterior and interior bodywork and engine tuning, costs €150,000.

References

External links

Ferrari Superfast 812 Competizione (www.ferrari.com)

812 Superfast
Grand tourers
Front mid-engine, rear-wheel-drive vehicles
Flagship vehicles
Cars introduced in 2017
Vehicles with four-wheel steering
2020s cars